The Stuhlinger Medal, whose official name is the "Ernst Stuhlinger Medal for Outstanding Achievement in Electric Propulsion", is the highest honor in the field of electric propulsion for spacecraft bestowed by the Electric Rocket Propulsion Society (ERPS), the main professional society in that field, to persons who made outstanding contributions to the science, technology or development of electric propulsion.

The Stuhlinger Medal was established by the ERPS in 2005 as the "Medal for Outstanding Achievement in Electric Propulsion", then renamed after its first recipient Ernst Stuhlinger (1913–2008), the German-born American rocket scientist, shortly after his death in 2008. The medal is typically awarded every two years during the ERPS's main conference, the International Electric Propulsion Conference.

Recipients

See also

 List of engineering awards

References

Electrical engineering awards